"I Like It, I Love It" is a song written by Jeb Stuart Anderson, Steve Dukes, and Mark Hall, and recorded by American country music artist Tim McGraw. It was released in July 1995 as the first single from his album All I Want. The song is McGraw's ninth single overall, and it became his third number-one single on the Hot Country Songs chart. It was recorded at FAME Studios in Muscle Shoals Alabama.

Music video
The music video premiered on CMT on August 4, 1995, during The CMT Delivery Room, and was directed and produced by Sherman Halsey. It features McGraw on his touring, using a pop-up style.

Track listing
Vinyl, 7"
A I Like It, I Love It (Album Version) 	3:25 	
B I Like It, I Love It (Club Mix) 	3:54

Custom version
A version of the song was made for the NHL's Nashville Predators for use with the team's current goal song, in a medley along with "Gold on the Ceiling" by The Black Keys.. This version of the song replaces the line "Don't know what it is about that little girl's lovin'" with "Don't know what it is about the Predators scorin'".

Chart performance
"I Like It, I Love It" debuted at number 50 on the U.S. Billboard Hot Country Singles & Tracks for the week of August 12, 1995.

Year-end charts

Certifications

References

1995 songs
1995 singles
Tim McGraw songs
Song recordings produced by Byron Gallimore
Song recordings produced by James Stroud
Curb Records singles
Music videos directed by Sherman Halsey